Diane Kelly is an American computer scientist, notable for her work on the analysis of information seeking behaviours, and the development of experimental methods to support further research in the field. She is director of the faculties of Information Sciences and Communication & Information at the University of Tennessee Knoxville. Kelly's work is strongly user-oriented, with human behaviour and interaction at the centre of her research. 
She received a simultaneous PhD in Information and Library Science and Cognitive Science Certificate from Rutgers University in 2004. She graduated with an MLS from Rutgers in 1999 and a BA in Psychology & English from the University of Alabama in 1996.

Other contributions made by Kelly include user modeling using implicit indicators of relevance,  interface development and analysis for enhanced user interest and interaction, and new methodologies for designing and evaluating interactive retrieval systems.

She was the recipient of the 2012 Karen Spärck-Jones Award in recognition of her work on information seeking behaviours and analysis.

See also

 Brenda Dervin
 George Kingsley Zipf

References

American computer scientists
Living people
Year of birth missing (living people)
Rutgers University alumni